The Master of the Beighem Altarpiece is a little-known Flemish painter who was active in Brussels during the first third of the sixteenth century.  Their art is basically Gothic, with classical influences.

Their name comes from a series of 4 paintings depicting the Flagellation of Jesus, Pontius Pilate shows Jesus to the people, the Crucifixion of Jesus, and the Resurrection of Jesus. These paintings were held in the church at Beigem, near Brussels, until 13 September 1914 when they were stolen just before the church was set on fire by the Germans in World War I. They are currently only known from photos. In 2014 the city council of Grimbergen offered a reward of 400,000 euros for information regarding the paintings.

Other paintings ascribed to them include a depiction of Christ in the Garden of Gethsemane and a painting of Christ before Pilate in the Philadelphia Museum of Art.

References

Artist page in Dictionnaire des peintres belges

Beighem Altarpiece, Master of the
16th-century Flemish painters
Painters from Brussels
Gothic painters